Angelo Cardona (born 5 January 1997)  is a Colombian social entrepreneur, peace and human rights activist. He is representative of Latin America to the International Peace Bureau. Co-founder and President of the Ibero-American Alliance for Peace and ambassador of Colombia to the Youth Assembly at the United Nations. In 2021, he won The Diana Award.

Career 
Cardona has denounced the human rights violation that his country is experiencing in different international decision-making scenarios such as the United Nations Headquarters, European Parliament, German Parliament, British Parliament, United States Congress, Argentina Congress and Colombian Congress.

He served as peace ambassador of the Global Peace Chain from 2020 to 2022, and in 2018 was invited as a speaker by the Amnesty International group in Berlin, to share his knowledge about the implementation of the peace agreement in Colombia. 

He is part of the Youth for Disarmament initiative of the United Nations Office for Disarmament Affairs and was among the winners of the '75 words for disarmament' launched by the United Nations to commemorate the 75 years of its foundation and the atomic bombings of Hiroshima and Nagasaki.

He studies business administration at the University of the People and won a scholarship to attend the Kennedy School of Government at Harvard University. In 2016, at age 19, he became member of the International Peace Bureau, and co-founded the International Peace Bureau Youth Network (IPBYN). In 2019, Cardona was appointed Council member of the International Peace Bureau.

Cardona is also part of the international Steering Group for the Global Campaign on Military Spending (GCOMS). As part of the campaign in 2020, together with 28 Colombian members of Congress, he proposed the transfer of 1 billion Colombian pesos from military purposes to the health sector. The Colombian Ministry of Defense agreed to 10 per cent of that, moving 100 million pesos (or US$25 million). In 2021, he supported by 33 Colombian members of congress demanded the President of Colombia, Iván Duque, allocate 1 billion pesos from the defense sector to the health sector. Cardona also requested the Government to refrain from purchasing 24 warplanes that would cost $4.5 million dollars. According to him, with that money, the government could purchase at least 300,000 vaccines against Covid-19 and strengthen the health system in the country. On May 4, 2021, amid violent protests unleashed in Colombia as a result of the proposal for a new tax reform. The Minister of Finance, José Manuel Restrepo, announced that the Government will comply with the request to not purchase the warplanes.

Awards and honors 
 2019, Cardona along with Asha de Vos, were the co-recipients of the 21st Century Icon Awards - Inspirational Icon Award
2020, 75 Words for Disarmament Award of the United Nations Office for Disarmament Affairs. 
2021, Award in honour of the late Diana, Princess of Wales - The Diana Award.
2021, The Youth Leadership Award at the Napolitan Victory Awards.  
2021, The Diana Legacy Award.  
2022, Nobel Peace Prize nominee.

See also 
 Colombian Conflict
 International Peace Bureau
 List of peace activists

References

External links 
 Official website
 Angelo Cardona Why is there no peace?

Colombian activists
Living people
1997 births
Colombian human rights activists
Colombian pacifists